The 2019 Cure Bowl was a college football bowl game played on December 21, 2019, in Orlando, Florida, with kickoff at 2:30 p.m. EST on CBS Sports Network. It was the fifth edition of the Cure Bowl, and one of the 2019–20 bowl games concluding the 2019 FBS football season. This was first Cure Bowl played at Exploria Stadium, as all prior editions were held at nearby Camping World Stadium. With FBC Mortgage as the title sponsor, the game was officially known as the FBC Mortgage Cure Bowl. Liberty defeated Georgia Southern 23–16, to claim their first bowl win in program history.

Teams
The game was played between the Liberty Flames and the Georgia Southern Eagles. Georgia Southern held a 3–0 record against Liberty in prior meetings.

Liberty Flames

Liberty finished their regular season with a 7–5 record while competing as an independent. This was the Flames' first bowl game since joining the Football Bowl Subdivision, accomplished in their first season of being eligible to qualify for a bowl game.

Georgia Southern Eagles

Georgia Southern finished their regular season with a 7–5 record (5–3 in conference), in second place of the East Division of the Sun Belt Conference. This was the Eagles' third bowl game since moving to the Football Bowl Subdivision in 2014; they had an undefeated record of 2–0 in prior bowls. Their 2018 team won that season's Camellia Bowl over Eastern Michigan, 23–21.

Game summary

Statistics

References

External links

Game statistics at statbroadcast.com

Cure Bowl
Cure Bowl
Cure Bowl
Cure Bowl
Georgia Southern Eagles football bowl games
Liberty Flames football bowl games